Aseyfer (also Romanized as Āṣeyfer) is a village in Buzi Rural District, in the Central District of Shadegan County, Khuzestan Province, Iran. At the 2006 census, its population was 495, in 76 families.

References 

Populated places in Shadegan County